The Abarth T-140 was a stillborn conceptual 6-liter, mid-engined Group 6 prototype sports car designed by Abarth in the late 1960's, but never produced. This was due to a change in the rules and regulations for 1967 imposed by the CSI, limiting the capacity of the large Group 6 sport-prototype cars to 3 liters, in an attempt to curtail and control the growing speed and power.

References

Abarth vehicles
Concept cars
Cars introduced in 1967
Sports cars
Rear-engined vehicles
Group 6 (racing) cars
Mid-engined cars
Rear mid-engine, rear-wheel-drive vehicles
Cars of Italy